Grand Hotel in Sopot is a historic five-star hotel located in Sopot, Pomeranian Voivodeship, Poland. It currently operates under the name Sofitel Grand Sopot.

History
The hotel was originally built in 1924–1927 at a cost of 20 million Danzig gulden as the most refined hotel in Sopot - the Kasino Hotel.

Between 19–26 September 1939, the hotel served as Adolf Hitler's headquarters from which he went twice to the outskirts of Warsaw to oversee the invasion of the city.

Between 11–16 September 1966, the hotel hosted the 16th Pugwash Conference entitled Disarmament and World Security, Especially in Europe.

On 13 December 1981, the hotel was the site of Operation "Mewa" (Seagull) carried out by the communist secret Security Service (SB) in which a group of Solidarity movement political dissidents was arrested including Lech Dymarski, Jacek Kuroń, Tadeusz Mazowiecki, Karol Modzelewski and Jan Rulewski.

In 1990, the hotel launched a casino, the third in Poland after Warsaw and Krakow. The Sofitel Grand Hotel is located at the seaside of the Gdańsk Bay, in the heart of the town and next to the beach. 
In 2006, the Sofitel Grand Hotel was totally refurbished and modernized while preserving the classical atmosphere from the earlier period. In 2007, to maintain the history of Sopot as a Spa resort, the Grand Spa by Algotherm opened.

Famous guests 

Some of the hotel's prominent guests include:
 Alfonso XIII, King of Spain
 Martin Bormann, head of the Party Chancellery (Parteikanzlei)  and private secretary to Adolf Hitler
 Charles Aznavour, French singer, songwriter and actor
 Josephine Baker, American-born French entertainer, singer and dancer
 Fidel Castro, president of Cuba
 Christopher Collins, West End Man and traveller to the far east
 Marlene Dietrich, German-born actress, singer, and entertainer
 Greta Garbo, Swedish-born actress
 Charles de Gaulle, general and president of France
 Hermann Göring, a leading member of the Nazi Party, second in command of the German Third Reich, commander of the Luftwaffe
 Karel Gott, Czech singer
 Adolf Hitler, Austrian-born leader of the German Third Reich and Nazi Party
 Jan Kiepura, Polish-born singer (tenor) and actor
 Henry Kissinger, American politician and diplomat
 Annie Lennox, Scottish pop musician and vocalist
 Czesław Miłosz, Polish poet and prose writer, Nobel Prize laureate
 Ignacy Mościcki, president of Poland
 Prince, American singer
 Vladimir Putin, President of Russia
 Reza Shah Pahlavi, shah of Iran
 Leni Riefenstahl, German film director, actress and dancer 
 Demis Roussos, Egypt-born Greek singer
 Shakira, Colombian singer
 Omar Sharif, Egypt-born actor
 Helena Vondráčková, Czech singer
 The Weeknd, Canadian singer
 Boney M, German pop and disco group
 Charles W. Yost, American diplomat

See also
Hotel Bristol, Warsaw

External links

 Official website

References

Hotels in Poland
Resort architecture in Pomerania
Buildings and structures in Sopot
Hotels established in 1927
Hotel buildings completed in 1927